Malcolm Harold Chisholm  (15 October 1945 – 20 November 2015) was a Mumbai-born Scottish inorganic chemist, a Professor of Chemistry and Biochemistry, and Distinguished University Professor of Mathematical and Physical Sciences at Ohio State University who contributed to the synthesis and structural chemistry of transition metal complexes.

Early life and education
Malcolm Harold Chisholm was born to Scottish parents on 15 October 1945 in Bombay, British India. Six months after his birth, Chisholm moved with his parents back to family's home of Inverness, Scotland. At the age of 3, his family moved again to southern England where he obtained his early education. He later went to Queen Mary College and received a BSc in 1966 and a PhD in Inorganic Chemistry in 1969 while working under the direction of Donald C. Bradley.

Career
After receiving his PhD, Chisholm went to the University of Western Ontario to work as a postdoctoral fellow in the laboratory of Howard Charles Clark from 1969 to 1972.

He held faculty positions at Princeton University, Indiana University, and Ohio State University.  He achieved recognition for developing the chemistry of alkoxy- and amido-supported complexes of dimolybdenum and ditungsten, illustrated by Mo2(NMe2)6.

Recognition
Chisholm received several awards and honors, among them:
Ludwig Mond Award of the Royal Society of Chemistry (2001)
American Chemical Society Award for Distinguished Service in the Advancement of Inorganic Chemistry (1999)
Davy Medal of the Royal Society (1999)
Centenary Prize from the Royal Society of Chemistry (1994)
American Chemical Society Award in Inorganic Chemistry (1989)

He was elected as a fellow of the Royal Society in 1990, a fellow of the Royal Society of Edinburgh in 2005, a member of the U.S. National Academy of Sciences in 2005 and a member of the Leopoldina in 2004.

References

1945 births
2015 deaths
Scottish chemists
20th-century chemists
Indiana University faculty
Members of the German Academy of Sciences Leopoldina
Members of the United States National Academy of Sciences
Ohio State University faculty
Princeton University faculty
Fellows of the Royal Society
Scientists from Mumbai